= Antonio Brognoli =

Italian poet & historian (1723–1807)

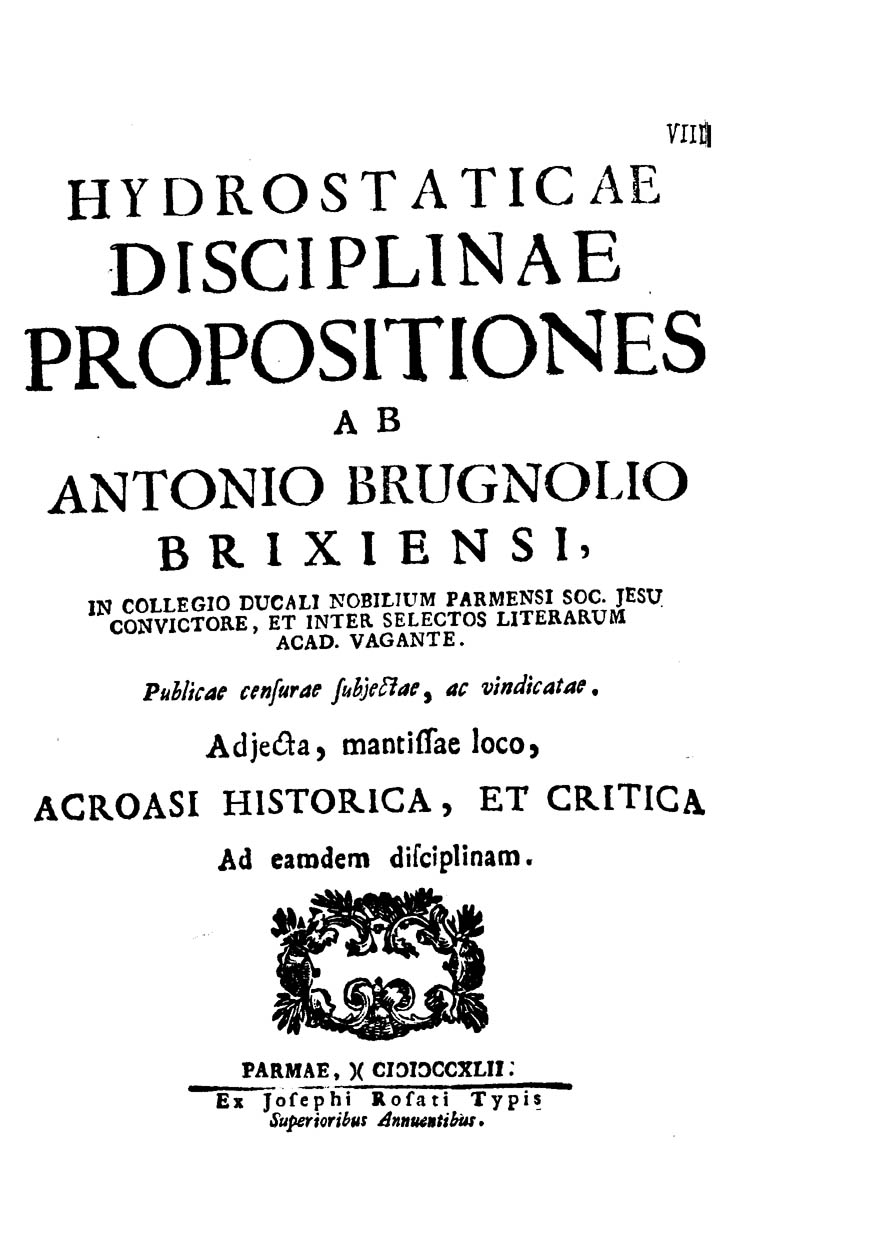
Hydrostaticae disciplinae propositiones (1742)

Antonio Brognoli (Brescia, 21 December 1723 – Brescia, 15 February 1807) was an Italian poet and historian, active in the Brescian cultural and political life.

== Works ==
- Hydrostaticae disciplinae propositiones (in Latin). Parma: Giuseppe Rosati. 1742.
- La lode, a sua eccellenza il signor cavaliere Pier Andrea Capello (in Italian). Brescia: Pietro Pianta. 1760.
- Il pregiudizio: Canti dodici (in Italian). Vol. 1. Venice: Colombiani. 1766.
- Il pregiudizio: Canti dodici (in Italian). Vol. 2. Venice: Colombiani. 1766.
- Elogj di Bresciani per dottrina eccellenti del secolo XVIII (in Italian). Brescia: Pietro Vescovi. 1785.
